District School No. 3, also known as Putnam Schoolhouse, is a historic one-room school building located at Lyme in Jefferson County, New York. The schoolhouse consists of a -story, two-by-three-bay wood-frame main block constructed about 1875, and a 1-story, two-by-one-bay rear addition constructed about 1900.  Also on the property is a double privy dating to about 1900.

It was listed on the National Register of Historic Places in 1990.

References

One-room schoolhouses in New York (state)
School buildings on the National Register of Historic Places in New York (state)
School buildings completed in 1875
Buildings and structures in Jefferson County, New York
National Register of Historic Places in Jefferson County, New York